The shield-nosed leaf-nosed bat or shield-nosed roundleaf bat (Hipposideros scutinares) is a bat from Laos and Vietnam.

Taxonomy
In their initial description for H. scutinares, Mark F. Robinson and colleagues placed this species in the H. pratti group, which also includes Pratt's roundleaf bat (H. pratti) and the shield-faced roundleaf bat (H. lylei).

Distribution
The specimens examined in the initial species description came from six locations in central Laos and two locations from Vietnam. The type locality is Ban Khankeo on the upper Nam Hinboun River in Khammouane Province, Laos. It was subsequently recorded in Cha Noi Cave, Phong Nha-Kẻ Bàng National Park, Vietnam.

Name
The specific epithet comes from the Latin scutum "shield" and nares "nostrils". It is known by the common names "shield-nosed leaf-nosed bat" and "shield-nosed roundleaf bat".

Notes

References

External links

Hipposideros
Mammals described in 2003
Mammals of Laos
Mammals of Vietnam
Bats of Southeast Asia